Enzo Ferrari (born 21 October 1942) is an Italian professional former footballer and manager.

Career

Footballer
As a footballer, he played in Serie A with Palermo; on 12 January 1969, in Rome, he scored a famous goal from 77 meter distance.

Coach
As a coach, he trained Udinese in Serie A and then Real Zaragoza, in La Liga.

After several experience in Serie A, B and C1 he lately became the general director of Triestina.

References

1942 births
Living people
Sportspeople from the Metropolitan City of Venice
Italian footballers
Italian expatriate sportspeople in Spain
Serie A players
Serie B players
Serie A managers
La Liga managers
Italian football managers
Italian expatriate football managers
S.S. Arezzo players
Genoa C.F.C. players
Palermo F.C. players
Udinese Calcio managers
Real Zaragoza managers
U.S. Triestina Calcio 1918 managers
U.S. Avellino 1912 managers
Calcio Padova managers
Palermo F.C. managers
Reggina 1914 managers
A.C. Reggiana 1919 managers
U.S. Alessandria Calcio 1912 managers
Ascoli Calcio 1898 F.C. managers
S.S. Arezzo managers
Association football forwards
Footballers from Veneto